Xagua may refer to;
 Xagua (tree), native to the tropical Americas
 Xagua language, or Achagua, a language of Colombia
 Xagua people, or Achagua, an ethnic group of Colombia

See also 
 Jagua (disambiguation)
 Sagua (disambiguation)

Language and nationality disambiguation pages